Nemanja Tomašević (born 9 August 1999) is a Serbian professional footballer who plays as a left back for Bosnian Premier League club Sarajevo. He is a former Serbian youth international.

References

1999 births
Living people
Association football defenders
Serbian footballers
Serbia youth international footballers
FK Sarajevo players